Enno Patalas (15 October 1929, in Quakenbrück – 7 August 2018, in Munich) was a German film historian, collector, and expert film preservationist. A former head of the Munich Film Museum (1973–1994), his restorations include  films such as Metropolis, M – Eine Stadt sucht einen Mörder and Die Nibelungen, all directed by Fritz Lang. Patalas also restored the film The Battleship Potemkin for viewing at the Berlin Film Festival in 2005.

He, along with director Ulrich Gregor, wrote the influential film history book Geschichte des Films (History of Film).

Filmography

References

External links
 
 Obituary by Jan-Christopher Horak at the UCLA website

1929 births
2018 deaths
People from Quakenbrück
German male non-fiction writers
German art historians
German film critics
Conservator-restorers